S. roseum may refer to:
 Solanum roseum, a plant species endemic to Bolivia
 Stephopoma roseum, a sea snail species

Synonyms
 Scindalma roseum, a synonym for Fomitopsis rosea
 Stylidium roseum, a synonym for Stylidium tenellum, a plant species

See also
 Roseum (disambiguation)